Dipsas trinitatis, the Trinidad snail-eater, is a non-venomous snake found in Trinidad.

References

External links
  Micaela Jemison - Newly discovered snakes use curved teeth to pry snails from their shells; Smithsonian Institution July 12, 2018

Dipsas
Snakes of South America
Reptiles of Trinidad and Tobago
Endemic fauna of Trinidad and Tobago
Reptiles described in 1926
Taxa named by Hampton Wildman Parker